In 1993, the Heinz Billing Prize for the advancement of scientific computation was presented for the first time. The aim of this award is to honour the achievements of those who have spent time and effort developing the hardware and software crucial for scientific advances. It is the purpose of the award to honour outstanding scientific contributions in all areas of computational science, specifically:

 Modelling and computer simulation
 Design of user interfaces based on new scientific findings
 Data handling and data analysis procedures
 Scientific visualization of data and processes

Previous Winners

1993  Dr. Hans Thomas Janka, Dr. Ewald Müller, Dr. Maximilian Ruffert
1994  Dr. Rainer Goebel
1995  Dr. Ralf Giering
1996  Dr. Klaus Heumann
1997  Dr. Florian Mueller
1998  Prof. Dr. Edward Seidel
1999  Dr. Alexander Pukhov
2000  Dr. Oliver Kohlbacher
2001  Dr. Jörg Haber
2002  Dipl. Ing. Daan Broeder, Dr. Hennie Brugman and Dipl. Ing. Reiner Dirksmeyer
2003  Dipl. Phys. Roland Chrobok, Dr. Sigurður F. Hafstein and Dipl. Phys. Andreas Pottmeier
2004  Dr. Markus Rampp and Dr. Thomas Soddemann
2005  Dr. Patrick Jöckel and Dr. Rolf Sander
2006  Rafal Mantiuk
2007  Axel Fingerle and Klaus Röller/ Hannah Bast and Stefan Funke
2011  Peter Wittenburg
2013  Thomas Hrabe
2015  Andreas Brandmeier
2017  Dr. Christian Schulz
2019  Tim Dietrich
2021  Adam Runions

See also 

 List of computer science awards

References

External links
 The Heinz Billing Prize for the Advancement of Computational Science

International awards
Computer science awards